Virginia Morell (born 1949) is an American science writer. She is the author of several books, and is a contributor to National Geographic and Science, among other publications.

Early life and education

Morell was born in 1949. She attended Pomona College, graduating in 1971. She specializes in animal behavior, cognition and conservation. Morrell resides in Oregon with her husband Michael McRae.

Career

Morell's book Ancestral Passions a biography about the Leakey family, was positively reviewed as a scholary work.

Morrell authored Animal Wise: The Thoughts and Emotions of Our Fellow Creatures, which was named by Kirkus Reviews as one of the Best Books of 2013 on Nature and the Environment. The book documents research on animal cognition that reveals the mental and emotional lives of animals including ants, dogs, elephants, fish and parrots. Liza Gross who reviewed the book for KQED commented that "Morell obliterates the lines that might separate us from the rest of the animal kingdom by relating trailblazing discoveries of the emotional and intellectual lives of animals. In the process, she challenges us to rethink our ethical obligations to the creatures who share our world." It was a New York Times Bestseller.

Bibliography

Books 
Ancestral Passions: The Leakey Family and the Quest for Humankind's Beginnings (1995)
Blue Nile: Ethiopia's River of Magic and Mystery (2001)
Wildlife Wars: My Fight to Save Africa’s Natural Treasures (2001: co-authored with Richard Leakey)
Inside Animal Minds: The New Science of Animal Intelligence (2012)
Animal Wise: The Thoughts and Emotions of Our Fellow Creatures (2013)
Becoming a Marine Biologist (2019)

Articles 
 
———————
Notes

References

External links

A Q&A with Virginia Morell, author of Animal Wise

1949 births
Living people
20th-century American women writers
21st-century American women writers
American animal welfare scholars
American conservationists
American naturalists
American nature writers
American science writers
American women biographers
Animal cognition writers
Discover (magazine) people
National Geographic people
Pomona College alumni
Writers from Oregon